
Year 392 (CCCXCII) was a leap year starting on Thursday (link will display the full calendar) of the Julian calendar. At the time, it was known as the Year of the Consulship of Augustus and Rufinus (or, less frequently, year 1145 Ab urbe condita). The denomination 392 for this year has been used since the early medieval period, when the Anno Domini calendar era became the prevalent method in Europe for naming years.

Events 
 By place 
 Roman Empire 
 Stilicho, Roman general (magister militum), defeats the Visigoths and Huns in Thrace. Emperor Theodosius I permits Alaric to go free on condition he provides,  as foederati, military services to the Roman Empire.
 May 15 – Emperor Valentinian II, age 21, is assassinated while advancing into Gaul against the Frankish usurper Arbogast. He is found hanging in his residence at Vienne. 
 August 22 – Arbogast nominates Eugenius, Roman teacher of rhetoric, as the next emperor of the Western Roman Empire. He sends ambassadors to Theodosius's court asking for his recognition.
 Theodosius I becomes the last emperor who rules the whole Roman Empire. He issues an edict reinforcing the prohibition of prayers or sacrifices at non-Christian temples. He also bans items of spiritual significance that could be used in the home, such as incense or spiritual figures.

 Asia 
 Asin becomes king of the Korean kingdom of Baekje.

Births 
 Flavius Marcian, Roman Emperor (d. 457)
 Galla Placidia, Roman Empress and daughter of Theodosius I (d. 450)
 Ming Yuan Di, emperor of the Xianbei state Northern Wei (d. 423)

Deaths 
 May 15 – Valentinian II, Roman Emperor (b. 371)
 Gregory Bæticus, bishop of Elvira (Spain)

References